The 2002 Central Michigan Chippewas football team represented Central Michigan University in the Mid-American Conference (MAC) during the 2002 NCAA Division I-A football season. In their third season under head coach Mike DeBord, the Chippewas compiled a 4–8 record (2–6 against MAC opponents), finished in sixth place in the MAC's West Division, and were outscored by their opponents, 384 to 267. The team played its home games in Kelly/Shorts Stadium in Mount Pleasant, Michigan, with attendance of 103,865 in six home games.

The team's statistical leaders included Derrick Vickers with 1,828 passing yards, Robbie Mixon with 1,361 rushing yards, and Rob Turner with 506 receiving yards. At the time, Mixon's 1,361 yards ranked as the seventh best season total in Central Michigan history. Mixon also set a Mid-American Conference record with 377 rushing yards (on 43 carries) in a 47-21 victory over against Eastern Michigan on November 2, 2002. Mixon was also selected at the end of the 2002 season as the team's most valuable player.

Jovan Clark had 20 tackles for loss for 62 yards, which was at the time tied for the second best total in school history. Offensive guard Kyle Croskey was selected as a first-team All-MAC player.

Schedule

References

Central Michigan
Central Michigan Chippewas football seasons
Central Michigan Chippewas football